Paschall is a neighborhood in Southwest Philadelphia, in the U.S. state of Pennsylvania. It is located in the vicinity of Cobbs Creek Park and Chester Avenue.

The William J. Tilden Junior High School was added to the National Register of Historic Places in 1986.
The Paschall Branch of the Free Philadelphia Library is central to the neighborhood, and is located at corner of S 70th St & Woodland Ave.

References

Neighborhoods in Philadelphia
Southwest Philadelphia